Louis Fauche-Borel (12 April 1762 – 4 September 1829) was a French counter-revolutionary. He was born and died in Neuchâtel.

1762 births
1829 deaths
French counter-revolutionaries
People from Neuchâtel